Saint Jacob of Nisibis (Greek: Ἅγιος Ἰάκωβος Ἐπίσκοπος Μυγδονίας; Armenian: Յակոբ Մծբնայ), also known as Saint Jacob of Mygdonia, Saint Jacob the Great, and Saint James of Nisibis, was the Bishop of Nisibis until his death.

He was lauded as the "Moses of Mesopotamia", and was the spiritual father of the renowned writer and theologian Saint Ephrem the Syrian. Saint Jacob was present at the first ecumenical council at Nicaea, and is venerated as a saint by the Church of the East, Eastern Orthodox Church, Oriental Orthodox Church,  Roman Catholic Church, and Eastern Catholic Churches.

Biography

Saint Jacob was the son of prince Gefal, and was born in the city of Nisibis in Mesopotamia in the 3rd century AD. It is claimed that he was a relative of Saint Gregory the Illuminator. Saint Jacob became a Confessor of the Faith for his suffering during persecution by Emperor Maximian. Saint Jacob became an anchorite in c. 280 in the mountains near Nisibis where, according to Saint Theodoret of Cyrrhus, he survived on herbs and fruits, and chose to wear no clothes, build shelter, or light fires for warmth. The saint became famous, and received visits from Sheria, Bishop of Arbela (r. 304–316), according to the Chronicle of Arbela.

The saint resolved to climb Mount Qardu, traditionally believed to be the resting place of Noah's Ark, and recover a fragment of the ark upon hearing from the hermit Maroukeh that local people doubted the Great Flood. Saint Jacob ascended the mountain and rested close to the summit; in his sleep, an angel placed a fragment of the ark close to him, and instructed him to awake. The saint brought the relic to the hermit Maroukeh and, according to the saint's hagiography, a sacred spring appeared where the saint had rested, reputed to have healing properties.

A number of miracles are credited to Saint Jacob by Saint Theodoret in Historia Religiosa (Religious History), in which the saint had a boulder explode beside a Persian judge who had given an unjust judgement. Also, in one incident, Saint Jacob cursed boastful, promiscuous women by a spring so that their hair became white, and the spring disappeared. The women subsequently repented, and the spring returned, however, the women's hair remained white. As well as this, a group of people attempted to deceive the saint whereby they asked for money to fund the burial of a man they had lain down and covered with a sheet with the illusion of death; consequently, the man died, and the people repented and thus the man was resurrected as a result of Saint Jacob's prayers.

Disagreement exists as to the date of the saint's consecration as bishop of Nisibis as it is argued it took place in c. 300, and he is recorded as the city's first bishop by Saint Ephrem the Syrian. However, Saint Jacob is credited as the successor of Babu, the first bishop of Nisibis (r. 300–309), by the Catholic Encyclopedia, who Saint Ephrem states was in fact Saint Jacob's successor. In his Chronography, Elijah of Nisibis states that Saint Jacob was consecrated bishop in 308.

The Chronicle of Edessa states that the saint constructed the first church in Nisibis in c. 313–320. Miles, Bishop of Susa, is said to have contributed a large quantity of silk from Adiabene to the church's construction. The foundation of the School of Nisibis is also attributed to Saint Jacob. Saint Jacob attended the First Council of Nicaea in 325, and opposed Arius. Saint Ephrem purportedly accompanied the saint to the council, however, this is considered apocryphal. Saint Jacob attended the funeral of Saint Metrophanes of Byzantium in 326.

Saint Jacob was present at the siege of Nisibis by Shapur II, Shahanshah of Iran, in 337/338, and according to Saint Theodoret, with encouragement from the city's population and Saint Ephrem, Saint Jacob ascended the walls and prayed for the city, and cursed the besiegers. The Martyrologium Hieronymianum relates that he died on 15 July, the thirtieth day of the siege, according to the Chronicle of 724. Gennadius and Saint Ephrem record that Saint Jacob was buried within the walls of Nisibis. Saint Theodoret adds that the Iranian army was afflicted by a swarm of gnats and flies summoned by the saint, and Shapur II subsequently abandoned the siege.

The saint is counted amongst the signatories of the Council of Antioch in 341, however, his presence at the council is unrecorded in other sources. In 350, according to the Chronicon Paschale, Saint Jacob helped defend Nisibis against Shapur II again, and as he was wearing the imperial regalia, was confused for Emperor Constantius II. Shapur II challenged the saint to fight outside the city, where it was revealed he was an apparition and the Iranian army withdrew as a result.

Relics

The Tomb of Saint Jacob of Nisibis located at the newly excavated Church of Saint Jacob of Nisibis.

The fragment of Noah's Ark discovered by Saint Jacob was later brought to Etchmiadzin Cathedral in Armenia.

Saint Theodoret relates that the bones of Saint Jacob were transferred from Nisibis to Edessa following the city's cession to Iran on 22 August 363. The saint's relics were later moved to Constantinople in 970, according to the Menologion of the Armenians at Venice.

Fragments of the skull of Saint Jacob were donated to Hildesheim Cathedral in Germany in 1367 by Lippold von Steinberg after the Battle of Dinklar (:de:Schlacht von Dinklar).

In 2018, relics of Saint Jacob were brought from the Armenian Church of Saint George in Plovdiv, Bulgaria, to Canada, where they were taken to the Armenian Church of Saint Gregory the Illuminator in Montreal on 17 June, and the Armenian Church of the Holy Trinity in Toronto on 24 June.

Works

Several homilies previously attributed to Saint Jacob by Gennadius of Massilia and others are now understood to be the work of Saint Aphraates. The misidentification arose from Aphraates' assumption of the name Jacob upon becoming bishop. Letters and canons, as well as other works, formerly attributed to the saint are known to be written in a later period.

References
Notes

Citations

Bibliography

3rd-century births
3rd-century Christian saints
3rd-century Romans
4th-century Mesopotamian bishops
4th-century Christian saints
4th-century deaths
Angelic visionaries
Byzantine saints of the Eastern Orthodox Church
Mesopotamian saints
Miracle workers
Nusaybin